was a Japanese artist. She was the first female artist among the Yoshida family artists.

She was the daughter of artist  and his wife . She married artist . Trained from an early age in the Western-style, she went on to create both naturalistic and abstract watercolors, oils, and woodblock prints. Her paintings of enlarged flower parts are sometimes, and perhaps incorrectly, associated with Georgia O'Keeffe’s work.

Her father and mother had a family of four girls, but to begin with no son was born to carry on 's work as a Western-style artist. As a result,  adopted his most talented student, . A few years later a son was born, but  was so favored by his adoptive father that he retained his status as first son. After  died,  enrolled  in some of the best Western-style studios in Tokyo. As often happened in Japan,  then married  in 1907.

 and  traveled together to the United States in 1903-05. They held their first brother and sister exhibition in Providence, Rhode Island. Only 16 years old,  was an instant American art world phenomenon, admired for her beauty and exotic kimono, but even more so for her graceful watercolor scenes of Japan. Shows in other East Coast cities followed. Each trip included travel around the world on the way back to Tokyo. She then entered Bunten exhibitions and received honors.

's first-born child, a girl, died in 1911. Overcome with grief,  stopped painting for almost 10 years. In 1911, her first son,  was born, but within a year he had contracted polio, leaving him partially paralyzed. A second son, was born in 1926. Both sons became artists. After  died in 1950,  lived first with 's family and then with 's family. Influenced by 's abstract art, she began in 1949 to create abstract flower paintings in oils, watercolors, and in 1953 in woodblock prints.

 published her autobiography,  (Vermilion Leaf Record), in 1978. In 1980 she held her first solo exhibition in Tokyo. She died peacefully in 's home in 1987, just days short of her 100th birthday. A very important large and scholarly exhibit of her work was mounted by the Fuchu Art Museum near Tokyo in 2002, where her treatment of light was seen as clearly differentiating her work from her husband's. The Minneapolis Institute of Arts featured her work in its 2002 exhibit and catalogue, “A Japanese Legacy: Four Generations of  Family Artists.”

Sources
 Fujio Yoshida, Shuyō no ki, Taiyō Publishing Co., Tokyo, 1978
 Yoshida Fujio: A Painter of Radiance, Fuchu Art Museum, 2002
 Allen, et al., A Japanese Legacy: Four Generations of Yoshida Family Artists, Minneapolis Institute of Arts, 2002.

1887 births
1987 deaths
Japanese printmakers
20th-century Japanese painters
20th-century printmakers